Nursel (Turkish literally "flood (sel) of light (nur)") is a Turkic feminine given name. Notable people with the name include:
Nursel Aydoğan (born 1958), Turkish politician
Nursel Duruel (born 1941), Turkish journalist and author
Nursel Köse (born 1961), Turkish-German actress

Turkic feminine given names